Goran Grubesic is a Croatian former footballer who played in the S.League, and the Canadian Professional Soccer League.

Club career 
Grubesic played in the S.League in 1996 with Singapore Armed Forces FC. During his tenure with SAFFC he won the 1996 Pioneer Series. In 2003, he went abroad to play in the Canadian Professional Soccer League with Toronto Croatia. During his time with Croatia he assisted in clinching a postseason berth by finishing third in the Western Conference. In the postseason Croatia was eliminated from the competition after a defeat to the Brampton Hitmen.

References 

Year of birth missing (living people)
Living people
Association football midfielders
Croatian footballers
Warriors FC players
Toronto Croatia players
Singapore Premier League players
Canadian Soccer League (1998–present) players
Croatian expatriate footballers
Expatriate footballers in Singapore
Croatian expatriate sportspeople in Singapore
Expatriate soccer players in Canada
Croatian expatriate sportspeople in Canada